The Burmese–Siamese War (1609–1622) was a war fought between the Toungoo dynasty of Burma and the Ayutthaya Kingdom of Siam. The war was over territory disputes in the Tenasserim. The Mon supported by the Siamese raid lower Burma. Burma and Siam battle in the Tenasserim coastal region and Lan Na. The Burmese were victorious in this war, regaining Mawlamyine (1618), Dawei (1622), and Lanna (1622), captured by King Naresuan in the previous war.

References

Burmese–Siamese wars
Wars involving the Ayutthaya Kingdom
1600s in Asia
Conflicts in 1609
1610s in Asia
1620s in Asia